This is a list of monuments in Lija, Malta, which are listed on the National Inventory of the Cultural Property of the Maltese Islands.

List 

|}

References

Lija
Lija